The 48th Golden Globe Awards, honoring the best in film and television for 1990, were held on January 19, 1991 at the Beverly Hilton. The nominations were announced on December 27, 1990.

Winners and nominees

Film 

The following films received multiple nominations:

The following films received multiple wins:

Television 

The following series received multiple nominations:

The following programs received multiple wins:

Presenters

Presenters 

 Bea Arthur
 Annette Bening
 Nina Blackwood
 Carol Burnett
 Kirk Cameron
 Macaulay Culkin
 John Cusack
 Faye Dunaway
 Estelle Getty
 Harry Hamlin
 Gregory Hines
 James Earl Jones
 Howard Keel
 Joanna Kerns
 Cheryl Ladd
 Christine Lahti
 Shirley MacLaine
 Walter Matthau
 Rue McClanahan
 Alyssa Milano
 Ken Olin
 Linda Purl
 Anthony Quinn
 Mickey Rooney
 Bob Saget
 Maximilian Schell
 Cybill Shepherd
 Nicollette Sheridan
 Ron Silver
 Oliver Stone
 Robert Urich
 Rachel Ward
 Betty White
 Esther Williams

Awards breakdown 
The following networks received multiple nominations:

The following networks received multiple wins:

See also
 63rd Academy Awards
 11th Golden Raspberry Awards
 42nd Primetime Emmy Awards
 43rd Primetime Emmy Awards
 44th British Academy Film Awards
 45th Tony Awards
 1990 in film
 1990 in American television

References

048
1990 film awards
1990 television awards
January 1991 events in the United States
Golden